Iskushuban District is a district in the northeastern Bari region of Somalia. Its capital lies at Iskushuban.

References

External links
 Administrative map of Iskushuban District

Districts of Somalia

Bari, Somalia